Kieron Bernard (born 2 August 1985 in Spanish Town) is a former Jamaican footballer last playing for Orlando City in the USL Professional Division.

Career

Youth and amateur
Bernard attended Jonathan Grant High School in Jamaica where he was a multi-sport athlete, playing basketball and running track in addition to playing soccer. He briefly played for Cooreville Gardens as a youth and Portmore United in the Jamaica National Premier League before moving to the United States in August 2007 to attend San Jacinto College.

At San Jacinto Bernard established himself as an outstanding junior college soccer player; he was a 2007 second team NJCAA All American and, in 2008, helped San Jacinto to the semifinals of the NJCAA national championship. During the 2008 collegiate off season, Bernard also played for the Austin Aztex U23 in the Premier Development League.

Professional
Bernard turned professional on 15 December 2008, when he signed with the newly established Austin Aztex in the USL First Division. On 23 February 2010 Austin announced the re-signing of Bernard to a new two-year contract with the club. He scored his first professional goal on 25 September 2010 in a 4–2 win over AC St. Louis.

Prior to the 2011 season, new owners purchased the club and moved it to Orlando, Florida, renaming it Orlando City SC The club began play in the USL Pro league in 2011.

On 30 May 2013, Bernard announced his retirement from soccer.

International
Bernard has also played for the Jamaica U-17, U-20 and U-23 national teams.

Honours

Orlando City
USL Pro (1): 2011

References

External links
 Austin Aztex bio
 2008–2009 National Premier League

1985 births
Living people
Austin Aztex U23 players
Austin Aztex FC players
Jamaican footballers
Jamaica youth international footballers
Jamaican expatriate footballers
Orlando City SC (2010–2014) players
Portmore United F.C. players
USL League Two players
USL First Division players
USSF Division 2 Professional League players
USL Championship players
Expatriate soccer players in the United States
People from Spanish Town
Association football defenders